Cannada may be a misspelling of:
Canada
Kannada